Mehdi Lari Lavasani (born 11 July 1947 in Tehran) is a retired Iranian defender who played for Iran national football team in 1972 Summer Olympics and 1969 RCD Cup. He was formerly playing for Taj Tehran and Iran national football team.

References

External links
 
 Mehdi Lavasani at TeamMelli.com

Iran international footballers
Iranian footballers
Esteghlal F.C. players
Living people
Olympic footballers of Iran
Footballers at the 1972 Summer Olympics
1947 births
Association football defenders